The 1936 Claxton Shield was the third annual Claxton Shield, an Australian national baseball tournament. It was held at Marrickville Oval in Sydney from 3 to 10 August, and was won by South Australia for the third time in a row. The other participating teams were Victoria and hosts New South Wales.

Western Australia applied to join the competition, however the plans for the tournament had already been confirmed between the other three states at that time. Alternate arrangements were made, where Victoria sent a team for a three-game series in September as a way for Western Australia to prepare for their entry in the 1937 tournament.

Format
As had been the case in the two previous editions of the tournament, each team met each other team twice over the course of the week. In each game, two competition points were on offer to the teams. The points were awarded as follows:
 Win – two points
 Tie – one point
 Loss – no points
At the end of the tournament, the team with the most points was declared the winner, and awarded the Claxton Shield. Had there been a tie between New South Wales and Victoria for first place, they would have been declared joint winners. However had South Australia been involved in a tie for first, they would have retained the Shield.

Results

Attempted expansion
On 3 June, a letter was received by the Victorian Baseball Association seeking permission for a Western Australian team to compete in the 1936 Claxton Shield. At that point in time, the New South Wales Baseball Association had already confirmed plans with the other state bodies for the tournament, and were advised that it was therefore too late for Western Australia to be admitted. As an alternative, Australian international cricketer Bert Oldfield was appointed as Western Australia's representative for the conference during the tournament to organise the 1937 Claxton Shield in Adelaide, where Western Australia first participated.

In preparation for their admission, the Western Australia Baseball League invited both New South Wales and Victoria to come to Perth to play in an interstate series. Though New South Wales did not participate, Victoria did send a team for a three-game series from 19 to 26 September, which the visitors won two games to one.

References

Bibliography
 
 

Claxton Shield
Claxton Shield
Claxton Shield
August 1936 sports events